Frederick Rodney Holt (born 1934) is an American computer engineer and political activist. He is Apple employee #5, and developed the unique power supply for the 1977 Apple II. Actor Ron Eldard portrayed him in the 2013 film, Jobs.

Background
Holt was born in  1934 to a psychiatry resident father and artist and teacher mother. He became interested in electronics by the age of 14 and taught ham radio courses for Wellesley High School by the age of 16.

In 1952, after graduating from high school, Holt married his high school girlfriend Joanne. He also joined Ohio State University as a math major. He and Joanne had two children, Christine and Cheryl, during this period. Holt later stated that while at OSU, he also  "became entranced with motorcycles and opened up my own motorcycle shop. That adventure failed within a year, however, and I then worked in the electronics industry to support my family. I continued to race bikes intermittently for the next twenty years." By 1958, when he was a grad student at OSU, he also became a political activist. He would later become involved in OSU's Free Speech Movement, served as editor of the Free Speech Press, and reconfigured himself as a socialist.

After graduate school, he became an electrical engineer with the Hickok Electrical Instrument company in Cleveland, Ohio, and later joined Atari as an Analog Engineer.

Apple Computer

During the early development of the Apple II, Apple Inc.'s co-founder, Steve Jobs asked his former boss, Atari's Al Alcorn for help with the power supply. Alcorn redirected Jobs to Holt, who saw himself as "a second-string quarterback" at Atari. He was initially "skeptical of Jobs and of Apple" (Swaine and Freiberger note that Holt "had trouble understanding the West Coast culture that shaped Apple's Founders"), telling Jobs that his rate was $200 per day. Jobs, however, replied that "we can afford you" and Holt joined the Apple II team in part responding to Alcorn's request to "help the kids out." Holt thus began to work "after hours at Atari on Apple's television interface and power supply." According to Apple's first CEO,  Michael ("Scotty") Scott, "One thing Holt has to his credit is that he created the switching power supply that allowed us to do a very lightweight computer compared to everybody else's that used transformers."
However, one history reports over a dozen computer systems and terminals with a switching power supply came out in years prior to the Apple II, including  PDP-11/20 minicomputer in 1969, Datapoint 2200 in 1970,  IBM 5100 portable computer in 1975, and decsystem 20 in 1976.
 Holt later joined Apple full-time as Apple Employee #5.

According to Holt, he was the "Chief Engineer and Vice President of Engineering during most of the reign of Apple II. I am most proud of my contributions to the floppy disk, the switching power supply, and radio interference problems. I received four patents for my work and was ennobled with the title of 'Chief Scientist'—whatever that may be. Amidst all the clamor and confusion of Apple's astonishing growth, my son Alan William was born. Six years later, after working what seemed to be sixteen-hour days and seven-day weeks, I was exiled by new management — the fourth member out of five of the original Apple team to be retired or pushed out."

2013 Jobs film

In an interview, Bill Fernandez and Daniel Kottke discussed the way in which Holt was conceptualized in the 2013 American independent film, Jobs (portrayed by actor Ron Eldard). Kottke disputed the characterization, noting that: "What completely cracked us all up is the scene where Rod arrives for the first time. Rod comes up wearing leathers, riding up on a motorcycle with long hair [...] he’s like this motorcycle dude. It just cracked us all up." Fernandez, who had not seen the film at the time of the interview, was also surprised by this portrayal. Holt, however, (according to Kottke), "thought it was hilarious." As for why he may have been characterized this way, Kottke states that, "Rod was really into dirt bikes. And I never saw him riding one, but he talked about it all the time. So the author just had him riding up on a motorcycle. I liked that guy. I met him on the set. I had no idea who he was when I met him because he doesn’t look at all like Rod, he has long straight hair and he’s wearing leathers." Fernandez, who was equally amused by this vision of Holt, responded by asking, "Who could this possibly be in the Apple universe? [...] It seems to me that there’s a lot of fan fiction about Apple Computer and about Steve Jobs, and I think that this is the biggest, flashiest piece of fan fiction that there’s been to date.".

Further reading
Hertzfeld, Andy. Revolution in the Valley: The Insanely Great Story of How the Mac was Made. O'Reilly Books, 2005.
Kahney, Leander. "The Macintosh 30th Anniversary Celebration Event, January 25, 2014.
Moritz, Michael. The Little Kingdom, 1984.
Nieva, Richard. "Early Macintosh developer: We would have worked for free, January 25, 2014.
Young, Jeffrey S. Steve Jobs: The Journey is the Reward. Glenview: Scott, Foresman and Co, 1988.

References

External links
Woz and Rod Holt c. 2013. - CNET
Twiggy Lives! At the Computer Museum: Happiness is a good friend – Woz and Rod Holt
Mac@30 Rod Holt, Daniel Kottke and Woz discuss Early Apple, Macintosh Anniversary, January 27, 2014.
 Rod Holt on IMDb

Living people
1934 births
American computer businesspeople
21st-century American engineers
Apple Inc. employees
Apple Fellows
Apple II family
Atari people
Computer designers
Ohio State University College of Arts and Sciences alumni
Wellesley High School alumni
Amateur radio people